Baguley is an electoral ward of the city of Manchester in Wythenshawe, England. The population at the 2011 census was 14,794.

Baguley is derived from the Old English words Bagca, badger, and Leah, clearing or meadow.

Historically in Cheshire, Baguley is mentioned in the Domesday Book of 1086. It was incorporated into Manchester in 1931.

History
Baguley is recorded in the Doomsday book with 1.5 ploughlands (1 ploughland being the amount of land that can be ploughed by a team of eight oxen.) . In 1086 the tenants in chief  were Gilbert (the hunter) and Hamo de Masci .  The Barons de Masci also had control over the manors of Dunham, Bowdon, Hale, Partington, and Timperley

In the 13th century, the Massey Family (Baron Hamon deMascy) was the main landlord in Northenden, Through marriage, the Massey's land in Baguley passed to the Baguley Family, who built Baguley Hall in the 14th century.

Baguley Hall is a 14th-century timber-framed manor house that may have replaced an 11th- or 12th-century house.

The ownership of Baguley can be mapped through the ownership of Baguley Hall and its manor lands.

Most of Baguley was developed for housing after World War II as part of the Wythenshawe Estate, including many council houses and later tower blocks (a typical one shown at right is Brookway Court); Manchester City Council publications refer to Baguley as "one of Europe's biggest housing estates." However, much of the social housing has been sold off under the "Right To Buy" scheme and there are also several private housing developments in the area; and parkland was provided from the start under the development plan.

Administrative history
Baguley was a township of Bowdon, one of the ancient parishes of the Bucklow Hundred of Cheshire. Under the Poor Law Amendment Act 1886 the township became a civil parish in its own right. In 1931 Manchester extended its boundaries south of the Mersey in to form Wythenshawe; Baguley was incorporated into the civil parish and city of Manchester, along with neighbouring Northenden and Northen Etchells.

Governance 

Baguley is part of the Wythenshawe and Sale East parliamentary constituency, which is currently represented at Westminster by Mike Kane MP. It is represented on the City Council by three councillors: Luke Raikes (Lab), Tracy Rawlins (Lab Co-op), and Paul Andrews (Lab Co-op)

 indicates seat up for re-election.
 indicates seat won in by-election.

Commerce
Baguley also includes the Roundthorn Industrial Estate where several factories and businesses are located. This included a Habitat store which opened in the 1970s, but closed in 2011 when the company downsized and closed all of its stores outside London. In the early 1990s, a large Tesco superstore opened in the area. Across the road from this is Brookway Retail Park, which is home to several stores including Aldi, B & M, Matalan, Pets at Home, and Wickes.

Railway
Baguley railway station was opened on 1 February 1866 and closed on 30 November 1964 during the Beeching cuts. Baguley station was mostly served by local trains operating from Stockport Tiviot Dale to and from Liverpool Central, and on a separate line from Stockport to Atrincham, but the station was located on the Mid-Cheshire Line and express trains ran through it.

The line is still used for passenger services running between Manchester, Stockport and Chester via Northwich and for a variety of goods services.

Public services
See also South Manchester University Hospital

Baguley is covered by the South Manchester Division of Greater Manchester Police.

References

Areas of Manchester
Manchester City Council Wards
Wythenshawe